Beijing Xijiao Airport  is a military airport in Beijing, China. It was also used by charter flights. It has one runway numbered 18/36.

History 
Xijiao Airport was built in 1938 by the Imperial Japanese Army during the Second Sino-Japanese War, and its ownership was transferred to the Nationalist government after the surrender of Japan in 1945. Since January 1949,  North China Aviation Bureau of the People's Liberation Army officially took over the management of Xijiao Airport, and formed the North China Air Transportation Brigade, which mainly consists of former Republic of China Air Force pilots.

On the 60th anniversary of the People's Republic of China, all aircraft that flew over Tiananmen took off from Xijiao Airport, and continued on to land at Beijing Nanyuan Airport.

References 

Chinese Airfields
Infrastructure of PLAAF and PLA Naval Air Arm Air Bases (includes Google Earth links for 229 bases).

 

Airports in Beijing
Chinese Air Force bases
1938 establishments in China
Airports established in 1938
Second Sino-Japanese War